A by-election was held for the New South Wales Legislative Assembly electorate of Narrabri on 3 June 1898 because of the death of Charles Collins.

Dates

Result

Charles Collins died.

See also
Electoral results for the district of Narrabri
List of New South Wales state by-elections

Notes

References

1898 elections in Australia
New South Wales state by-elections
1890s in New South Wales